In geometry, a curve of pursuit is a curve constructed by analogy to having a point or points representing pursuers and pursuees; the curve of pursuit is the curve traced by the pursuers.

With the paths of the pursuer and pursuee parameterized in time, the pursuee is always on the pursuer's tangent.

History

The pursuit curve was first studied by Pierre Bouguer in 1732. In an article on navigation, Bouguer defined a curve of pursuit to explore the way in which one ship might maneuver while pursuing another.

Leonardo da Vinci has occasionally been credited with first exploring curves of pursuit. However Paul J. Nahin, having traced such accounts as far back as the late 19th century, indicates that these anecdotes are unfounded.

Single pursuer

The path followed by a single pursuer, following a pursuee that moves at constant speed on a line, is a radiodrome. 

It is a solution of the differential equation 
.

Multiple pursuers

Typical drawings of curves of pursuit have each point acting as both pursuer and pursuee, inside a polygon, and having each pursuer pursue the adjacent point on the polygon. An example of this is the mice problem.

See also
Logarithmic spiral
Tractrix
Circles of Apollonius#Apollonius pursuit problem
Pursuit–evasion

References

External links

Mathworld, with a slightly narrower definition that |L′(t)| and |F′(t)| are constant
MacTutor Pursuit curve

Curves
Pursuit–evasion